Tiwi, officially the Municipality of Tiwi is a 1st class municipality in the Province of Albay, Philippines. According to the 2020 census, it has a population of 56,444 people.

Etymology
Friars called the place Tigbi, which evolved into Tivi and, then, finally to its present name Tiwi.

History
Tiwi began as a barrio of Malinao before it was formally organized as a politically independent pueblo in 1696. As a pueblo, it was governed by a gobernadorcillo. As a Catholic parish, it was administered by a secular priest under the then Diocese of Nueva Caceres, now an archdiocese. In its primeval stages, it had some 1,105 houses, a parish church, a community-funded primary school, and a cemetery outside the town proper. The villagers ordinarily engaged in fishing, planting rice, corn, sugarcane, indigo, fruit-bearing trees, and vegetables. Aside from agriculture, they also busied themselves weaving cotton and abaca clothes, and in pottery.

In Kagnipa, known today as Barangay Baybay, the dilapidated Sinimbahan, the remnant of the first concrete house of worship built by the Franciscans led by the pastor of Malinao, Fray Pedro de Brosas, remains to be the deaf witness of both the villagers' ready acceptance of the Christian faith and their suffering of persecution at the hands of the Moslems; Christian missionaries called them Moros. The parola by the shore of Sitio Nipa of the same barangay testifies to the people's paralyzing fear of the Moros' capricious forays. The market site of the pueblo before these raids was located in the present location of Baybay Elementary School. In order to sidetrack surprise attacks, at least temporarily, the market site was transferred to southernmost part of now Barangay Baybay; henceforth, it was called Binanwaan. The transfer, however, was useless. Finally, to have enough time to escape and keep themselves safer from their enemies' easy attacks, they moved the market site and their settlement to the present poblacion now named as Barangay Tigbi. Before the Moro's assaults, Barangay Baybay was then the center of trade and commerce because of its easy accessibility to marine transportation of goods from the islands of what are now known as Catanduanes, San Miguel, Rapu-Rapu, and Batan, not to mention those from adjoining pueblos in the mainland of Ibalon, now the province of Albay, and the Camarines.

In the extant records of the municipality, the first chief executive of the municipal government was Don Lorenzo Mancilla installed in 1776.

Geography

According to the Philippine Statistics Authority, the municipality has a land area of  constituting  of the  total area of Albay.

Climate

Barangays
Tiwi is politically subdivided into 26 barangays.

Lourdes is another Barangay in the Municipality of Tiwi, Albay.

Demographics

In the 2020 census, Tiwi had a population of 56,444.

Religion
Roman Catholicism remained the dominant religion since its propagation in the town 1696.

Language
Generally the town speaks Central Bikol as their first language while others speak Buhinon in the areas near Buhi, Camarines Sur. Other Bikol languages are spoken by significant minorities that are from other areas of the Bicol Region.

The majority of the inhabitants also understand Tagalog (Filipino) and English as second languages.

Economy

Tourism

 Parish Church of Our Lady of Salvation, Barangay Joroan
 Parish Church of St. Lawrence, Deacon & Martyr, Barangay Tigbi
 Tiwi Hot Springs Resorts/Mendoza & Mirasol Resorts - Barangay Naga
 Corangon Shoal, Barangay Baybay
 PhilCeramics, Barangay Putsan
 Naglagbong Park and Science Centrum Museum, Barangay Naga
 Rangasa Spring Resort
 Sinimbahan Ruins, Barangay Baybay
 Japanese Garden, Barangay Tigbi
 Bugsukan Falls, Barangay Misibis
 Baybay-Bolo Beach
 Sogod Beach
 Maslog Waterfalls, Barangay Misibis
 Tiwi Geothermal Plant
 DJC Halo-Halo
 Capantagan Waterfalls, Barangay Cale

References

External links

 [ Philippine Standard Geographic Code]

Municipalities of Albay
Spa towns in the Philippines